Kråsen Crevasse Field is a crevasse field about  long in the lower part of Jutulstraumen Glacier, in Queen Maud Land, Antarctica. It was mapped by Norwegian cartographers from surveys and air photos by the Norwegian–British–Swedish Antarctic Expedition (1949–52) and air photos by the Norwegian expedition (1958–59) and named Kråsen (the crop).

References

Crevasse fields of Queen Maud Land
Princess Martha Coast